Shirvan Kala is a village in the Daşoguz region of Turkmenistan.

Site 
The village is named after an eponymous fortress, aside a plateau. Atop an adjacent hill, lies the Mausoleum of Nalach Baba. The Deryalyk Gas Compressor Station is nearby.

Economy 
UN/LOCODE designates Shirvan Kala as a probable road terminal, pending confirmation from Turkmen authorities.

Notes

References 

Villages in Turkmenistan